Corn schnitzel is an Israeli fried corn dish and variant of Israeli schnitzel that is especially popular among vegetarians, vegans, and children.

History

Although corn is not a popular vegetable used in traditional Jewish cuisine, except for Romanian Jewish cuisine, corn schnitzel was invented by Israelis in the early 20th century. The popularity of corn rose as corn schnitzel became an inexpensive substitute for chicken schnitzel in Israel during the 20th century due to the country's populace enduring economic difficulties and the relative low cost of corn compared to the chicken, turkey and fish used in regular Israeli schnitzel. Corn schnitzel became a popular dish prepared at home and a mainstay of Israel's restaurant menus. When economic conditions in Israel began to improve later in the 20th century, corn schnitzel became popular with the large number of vegetarians and vegans in the country, as for a time it was one of the few vegetarian options on most restaurant menus. Beginning in the 1970s commercially produced premade corn schnitzel began to be sold in frozen form by Osem, Ta'amti and others, and many vegetarians purchased these frozen versions of the dish as it was an easy to prepare and inexpensive option. As vegetarianism and veganism have increased in popularity in Israel over the last few decades, corn schnitzel's popularity has waned in favor of falafel as well as various newer meat substitutes. Today corn schnitzel has become especially popular with children, and is a mainstay of children's menus across the country, and is commonly served as a public school lunch and by parents at home due to its perception as a "healthy" alternative to chicken schnitzel as it is made with corn instead of chicken.

Overview

Corn schnitzel consists of frozen, canned, or other cooked corn that has been puréed in a food processor and mixed with egg, flour, breadcrumbs, and various spices and seasonings to form a stiff batter. The batter is then scooped and formed into disks or oval-shaped, then it is breaded with a mixture of breadcrumbs and sesame seeds and fried. It is often served with ketchup and a side of French fries or mashed potatoes, especially by children in Israel among whom the dish is popular.

References

See also

Israeli schnitzel
Latkes

Israeli cuisine
Maize dishes
Jewish cuisine